The  House of Manteuffel  is the name of an old and influential German Pomeranian noble family, which later also resided in Brandenburg, Prussia, Silesia, Mecklenburg, Poland, the Baltics and in Russia.

History 

Manteuffel family was first mentioned in 1256, but the family history officially begins with Henricus Manduvel who is first mentioned on 14. November 1287. The family was one of the oldest and most distinguished one in the region of Westphalia. On 10 March 1709 the family was raised to the title of Baron, while in 1719 they were raised to the hereditary title of Count. On 25 August 1790 the family received the title of Imperial Count from Charles Theodore, Elector of Bavaria as an Imperial vicar.

Notable family members 

 Edwin Freiherr von Manteuffel (1809–1885), Prussian Generalfeldmarschall in the Franco-Prussian War.
 Fritz Manteuffel (1875–1941) German gymnast
 Hans Manteuffel (1879-1963), architect
 Hans-Wilhelm Doering-Manteuffel (1898–1963), general in the Luftwaffe of Nazi Germany during World War II
 Hasso von Manteuffel (1897–1978), German general and politician 
 Heinrich von Manteuffel (1696–1798), Prussian Lieutenant General in Wars of Frederick the Great
  (1806-1879), German politician, prussian agriculture minister
 Otto Karl Gottlob von Manteuffel (1844-1913), German politician, member of German Reichstag
 Otto Theodor von Manteuffel (1805–1882), Prussian Prime Minister
 Sabine Doering-Manteuffel (born 1957), German ethnologist
 Wanda Zawidzka-Manteuffel (1906–1994), Polish graphic artist

Members of the family Zoege von Manteuffel or Manteuffel-Szoege 
 Edward Manteuffel-Szoege (1908-1940), Polish artist
 Felix von Manteuffel or Friedrich Karl Baron von Manteuffel-Szoege (born 1945), German actor
 Georg von Manteuffel-Szoege (1889–1962), politician
 Kurt Zoege von Manteuffel (1881–1941), Baltic German art historian
 Leon Manteuffel-Szoege (1904–1973), Polish surgeon
 Tadeusz Manteuffel or Tadeusz Manteuffel-Szoege (1902–1970), Polish historian
 Werner Zoege von Manteuffel (1857–1926), medical surgeon

External link

German-language surnames
German noble families
Military families of Germany
Pomeranian nobility
Mecklenburgian nobility
Bavarian nobility
Brandenburgian nobility
Silesian nobility
Baltic nobility